Raramuthirakkottai is a village in the Papanasam taluk of Thanjavur district, Tamil Nadu, India.

Demographics 

As per the 2001 census, Raramuthirakkottai had a total population of 2803 with 1392 males and 1411 females. The sex ratio was 1014. The literacy rate was 70.55.

References 

 

Villages in Thanjavur district